Heliothelinae is a subfamily of the lepidopteran family Crambidae. It was described by Hans Georg Amsel in 1961.

Genera
Eclipsiodes Meyrick, 1884
Heliothela Guenée, 1854 (= Nyctarcha Meyrick, 1884, Orosana Walker, 1863)
Phanomorpha Turner, 1937

References

 
Crambidae
Taxa named by Hans Georg Amsel
Moth subfamilies